Raj Kishore (1933 - 7 April 2018) was an Indian actor who played roles in the Indian films such as Sholay (1975), Padosan (1968), Deewaar (1975), Ram Aur Shyam (1967), Hare Rama Hare Krishna (1971), Karishma Kudrat Kaa (1985), Aasmaan (1984), Bombay To Goa (1972) and Karan Arjun (1995).

Death
Raj Kishore died on 7 April 2018 at the age of 85, due to a heart attack. He is survived by his wife Liza Kishore and son Prem Kishore.

References

External links
 

1933 births
2018 deaths
Indian male film actors
Male actors in Hindi cinema
20th-century Indian male actors